Zerpenschleuse is a populated place in Brandenburg, Germany.

See also
Liebenwalde
Marienwerder, Brandenburg
Schorfheide

References

Towns in Brandenburg